Hajji Khademi (also Romanized as Ḩājjī Khādemī and Ḩājī Khādemī; also known as Ḩājjī Khādem) is a village in Gurband Rural District, in the Central District of Minab County, Hormozgan Province, Iran. At the 2009, its population was 2,545, in 509 families.

References 

Populated places in Minab County